Damas River or de Las Damas River is a river of Chile located in Los Lagos Region. The river originates at an area known as Quema del Buey in the commune of Entre Lagos between Puyehue and Rupanco Lake. The river ends at its convergence with Rahue River. Damas River traverses the city of Osorno from east to west and separates the neighborhood of Pilauco from the rest of the city.

References

Rivers of Los Lagos Region
Rivers of Chile